The Canon EOS R5 is a full-frame mirrorless interchangeable-lens camera officially announced by Canon on July 9, 2020 alongside the lower-resolution EOS R6 and various new RF mount lenses. While it is not a direct successor to any of Canon's previous mirrorless cameras, it does have clear improvements and advantages over the EOS R, namely: a new DIGIC X processor and sensor, 8K video capture, a new autofocus system, and the ability to take videos with 10-bit colours. The camera is available as body only, or with the Canon RF 24-105mm f/4L IS USM lens.

Features 

 44.8-megapixel full-frame CMOS sensor
 8K raw video recording at up to 29.97fps
 4K 10-bit video recording at up to 119.9fps
 100% autofocus coverage
 5,940 user-selectable autofocus points
 Native ISO range of 100 to 51,200; expandable 64 to 102,400
 High-speed continuous shooting of up to 12fps with mechanical shutter; up to 20fps with the electronic (silent) shutter
 Color depth of 10-bit for HDR videos
 5-axis in-body image stabilization which can provide up to 8 stops of shake correction
 Dual card slots (CFexpress and UHS-II SD memory cards)
 0.5" 5.76 million dots OLED electronic viewfinder with 120fps refresh rate and vari-angle LCD touchscreen
 Canon's Dual Pixel CMOS AF II with Zero Crop & 100% AF Coverage
 2.4GHz and 5GHz built-in Wi-Fi and Bluetooth connectivity
 Optional wireless file transmitter and battery grip

Reception

Overheating issues 
Shortly after the EOS R5's initial announcement, concerns arose about issues of overheating while recording video, especially 8K video, after short periods of time. In response to users' complaints, Canon issued a media alert addressing these overheating issues, including how long it will take for the camera to overheat at each resolution, why a fan was not included, and how users can prevent the camera from overheating. 

According to Canon's reported data, the EOS R5 will begin to overheat after recording for 20 minutes at 8K resolution though the average run time of videos published on social media is 11.7 minutes. A fan was not included to preserve its compact size. Users can delay overheating by toggling on "Overheat Control" in settings, which will adjust resolution and frame rate automatically to prevent overheating. Although Canon offered this explanation, users have continued to complain.

Other testers, however, discovered continuous shooting is possible for up to four hours in 4KHQ mode with an external recorder if no memory cards are inserted, the screen is off, and a dummy battery is used. With an actual battery, again overheating can be avoided for the life of the charge of the battery, about an hour 45 minutes.

Canon EOS R5 C 
Canon addressed overheating issues with a modified follow-up model, the Canon EOS R5 C, announced in January 2022. Intended as a hybrid between the R5 and the EOS C video-oriented line of cameras, the R5 C includes a cooling fan. This allows the camera to shoot video at any resolution indefinitely, at the cost of a higher weight (770g) and a larger size (142 x 101 x 111 mm). The R5 C also omits in-body image stabilization. It can record in a larger variety of video modes than the base model, and it and supports some additional video-oriented features such as false colour and timecode integration.

Images

See also
 Canon EOS R
 Canon EOS RP
 Canon EOS R6

References

External links 
 

Canon RF-mount cameras
Cameras introduced in 2020
Full-frame mirrorless interchangeable lens cameras